The South Carolina Circuit Court is the state court of general jurisdiction of the U.S. state of South Carolina. It consists of a civil division (the Court of Common Pleas) and a criminal division (the Court of General Sessions). 

The Circuit Court is the state trial court of general jurisdiction in South Carolina. It is also a superior court, having limited appellate jurisdiction over appeals from the lower Probate Court, Magistrate's Court, and Municipal Court; and appeals from the Administrative Law Judge Division, which hears matters relating to state administrative and regulatory agencies.

South Carolina's 46 counties are divided into 16 judicial circuits:
First Circuit – Calhoun, Orangeburg, Dorchester
Second Circuit – Aiken, Barnwell, Bamberg
Third Circuit – Lee, Sumter, Clarendon, Williamsburg
Fourth Circuit – Dillon, Chesterfield, Darlington, Marlboro
Fifth Circuit – Kershaw, Richland
Sixth Circuit – Chester, Fairfield, Lancaster
Seventh Circuit – Cherokee, Spartanburg
Eighth Circuit – Abbeville, Newberry, Laurens, Greenwood
Ninth Circuit – Berkeley, Charleston 
Tenth Circuit – Oconee, Anderson
Eleventh Circuit – McCormick, Edgefield, Lexington, Saluda
Twelfth Circuit – Florence, Marion
Thirteenth Circuit –  Pickens, Greenville
Fourteenth Circuit – Allendale, Colleton, Hampton, Beaufort, Jasper
Fifteenth Circuit – Georgetown, Horry
Sixteenth Circuit – York, Union

Each has at least one resident circuit judge who maintains an office in his or her home county within the circuit. There are currently 46 circuit judges who serve the 16 circuits on a rotating basis. Court terms and assignments determined by the Chief Justice based upon recommendations of Court Administration. Circuit court judges are elected by the South Carolina General Assembly to staggered terms of six years.

Citizens of each circuit elect a circuit solicitor, a state prosecutor equivalent to a district attorney in many other states.  Assistant solicitors are then appointed by circuit solicitor.

References

External links
 Official information from the South Carolina Judicial Department

South Carolina
South Carolina state courts
Courts and tribunals with year of establishment missing